Everything I Need To Know I Learned From A Little Golden Book is a 2013 best selling picture book by Diane Muldrow. It is a humorous guide to life that is derived from Little Golden Books stories and their illustrations.

Reception
Everything I Need To Know received mixed reviews. A reviewer for the Sydney Morning Herald, although calling it "a nostalgic trip with wonderful illustrations", was disappointed about its lack of depth ("Perhaps the saddest part of Muldrow's otherwise uplifting book is her treatment of The Saggy Baggy Elephant."), and that some stories (Scuffy the Tugboat, The Bunny Book) were not included.

It has also been reviewed by Kirkus Reviews that called it "Chicken soup for fans of Golden Books", Publishers Weekly, School Library Journal, and Radio New Zealand.

It is a best seller.

References

External links
Library holdings of Everything I need to know I learned from a Little Golden Book

2013 non-fiction books
American picture books
Golden Books books
Comedy books
Self-help books